Destin is a city located in Okaloosa County, Florida. It is a principal city of the Crestview–Fort Walton Beach–Destin, Florida, metropolitan area.

Located on Florida's Emerald Coast, Destin is known for its white beaches and emerald green waters. Originating as a small fishing village, it is now a popular tourist destination. According to the Florida Department of Environmental Protection, over 80 percent of the Emerald Coast's 4.5 million visitors each year visit Destin. The city styles itself "The World's Luckiest Fishing Village", and claims to have the largest fishing vessel fleet in the state of Florida.

The city is located on a peninsula separating the Gulf of Mexico from Choctawhatchee Bay. The peninsula was originally a barrier island. Hurricanes and sea level changes gradually connected it to the mainland. In the 1940s, it technically became an island again with the completion of the Choctawhatchee-West Bay Canal.

History
Destin is named after Leonard Destin, a New London, Connecticut fishing captain who settled in the area between 1845 and 1850. He built a New England colonial home at the location of the Moreno Point military reservation. Captain Destin and his descendants fished the area for decades.

Condominiums were first built in Destin during the 1970s, although Destin was not incorporated as a municipality until 1984. The city has experienced rapid growth since the 1980s.

Geography
The city is located on a peninsula separating the Gulf of Mexico from Choctawhatchee Bay. The peninsula was originally an island; hurricanes and sea level changes gradually connected the island to the mainland.

Destin is near several other cities in the region. The city of Fort Walton Beach is located to the west at the inlet of Santa Rosa Sound into Choctawhatchee Bay. North of Destin, across the bay is Niceville, with the Mid-Bay Bridge linking the two by road. U.S. Route 98 is the main route through the city, running from west to east. U.S. Route 98 leads east 56 mi (90 km) to Panama City and west 48 mi (77 km) to Pensacola.

At the western tip of the peninsula is East Pass (also known as Destin Pass), separating it from Santa Rosa Island to the west. East Pass is the only outlet of Choctawhatchee Bay into the Gulf of Mexico, Many sources claim that the current pass was dug by hand with an inrush of water widening it within hours. The early pass appears (at the East end of Destin Harbor) in early maps and surveys from Spanish, French, and English surveyors, such as Thomas Jefferys's 1775 map The Coast of West Florida and Louisiana. Frequent dredging is required to keep East Pass navigable.

"Crab Island," was actually two islands made from sand that the Army Corps of Engineers dredged up from the East Pass.  These islands were large enough to inhabit sea grass, small shrubs and nesting seabirds.  It has been reduced to a significant sandbar, which appears only when the tide is out.  It has become a popular anchorage in the area. The entrance to Destin Harbor, a lagoon between the beaches and the main body of the western portion of the peninsula, is located just north of the East Pass jetty. The lagoon is formed by a sand spit named Holiday Isle; many condominiums have been built along the harbor since the 1970s. Norriego Point protects the harbor and was doubled in size in order to protect against coastal erosion.

Climate

Environmental issues
A 2013 study identified the city as one of the cities in Florida most in risk of inundation. A 2019 report by the Florida Department of Environmental Protection listed sections of the beach as "critically eroded".

The city received $11 million dollars from the Deepwater Horizon oil spill settlement. This was used to address coastal erosion on Norriego Point which protects the important harbor. Otherwise the city has not developed a plan to address sea level rise and coastal erosion.

Demographics

As of the census of 2000, there were 11,455 people, 4,437 households, and 3,135 families residing in the city. The population density was 1,477.1 inhabitants per square mile (570.1/km). The racial makeup of the city was 96.21% White, 0.37% African American, 0.40% Native American, 1.03% Asian, 0.08% Pacific Islander, 0.37% from other races, and 1.54% from two or more races. Hispanic or Latino of any race were 2.66% of the population.

24.8% of households had children under the age of 18 living with them, 53.0% were married couples living together, 8.0% had a female householder with no husband present, and 35.7% were non-families. 27.4% of all households were made up of individuals, and 8.5% had someone living alone who was 65 years of age or older. The average household size was 2.26 and the average family size was 2.72.

The median age was 42 years. For every 100 females, there were 101.8 males. For every 100 females age 18 and over, there were 100.4 males.

The median income for a household in the city was $53,042, and the median income for a family was $60,498. Males had a median income of $42,218 versus $26,146 for females. The per capita income for the city was $32,048. About 3.0% of families and 5.5% of the population were below the poverty line, including 6.2% of those under age 18 and 2.0% of those age 65 or over.

Arts and culture

Tourism
The white beaches and emerald waters of the Destin area draw many tourists. Florida's Department of Environmental Protection estimates that more than 80 percent of the Emerald Coast's 4.5 million yearly visitors travel to the region to visit Destin. Visitors can charter fishing vessels from the harbor, and there are 12 beach access points in the city. Among the access points is Henderson Beach State Recreation Area. A portion of the Gulf Islands National Seashore, the Okaloosa Day Use Area, is just across East Pass on Santa Rosa Island.

The sand on Destin's beaches is some of the whitest in the world. The sand comes from the Appalachian Mountains, and is made of finely ground quartz crystal giving the appearance of sugar. Residue flows down the Apalachicola River and is deposited into the Gulf of Mexico. Because of the currents the sand drifts west along the Gulf Coast and settles from east of Panama City to the Alabama coast.

Several events also take place throughout the year as well. For the month of October, the annual Destin Fishing Rodeo draws anglers to Destin each year since 1948. Also in the month of October is the Destin Seafood Festival, where fresh seafood and local artists gather for one weekend every October.

In addition to an assortment of hotels and motels, many high-rise condominiums are located in Destin. The first condominiums in Destin were built in the 1970s, and construction continues today. Visitors play a large part in Destin's economy – the city's population of around 12,000 balloons to 40,000 during the tourist season.

Real estate in Destin, Florida is consumed in large part by privately owned vacation rentals. Privately-owned vacation rentals that can be found in Destin consist of condominiums, beach homes, townhomes, resorts, studios, cottages, and a few bungalows. Most vacation properties are found on the south side of US Hwy 98 near the Gulf, while most locals live on the northern side of US Hwy 98 by the Choctawhatchee Bay.

Destin's surroundings include other popular tourist destinations. Sandestin, Florida, located to the east in Walton County, is a popular golf and beach resort. Further east along the coast are the master-planned community of Seaside, filming location of the 1998 movie The Truman Show; Grayton Beach, Florida; and Rosemary Beach, Florida. To the west are Navarre Beach and Pensacola Beach, and the Civil War fortification Fort Pickens is located at the western end of Santa Rosa Island. Many celebrities own homes in the area.

Libraries

Destin Library was founded in 1940.  It is part of the Okaloosa County Public Library Cooperative.

Government

The city government consists of a seven-member City Council.

Education
Okaloosa County School District operates public schools, including:
 Destin Elementary School
 Destin Middle School
 Destin High School – public charter school

Notable people

 Emeril Lagasse, celebrity chef
 Joe A. Rector, artist
 Jerry Jones, businessman, Dallas Cowboys owner

References

External links

 City of Destin

 
Populated places established in 1984
Cities in Okaloosa County, Florida
Populated coastal places in Florida on the Gulf of Mexico
Beaches of Florida
Cities in Florida
Former census-designated places in Florida
Beaches of Okaloosa County, Florida
1984 establishments in Florida